Barff may refer to:
 Bower–Barff process
Samuel Barff